Jack Darkins was a British tennis player, who played in the 1946 Wimbledon Championships in singles.

Darkins defeated Egypt's Mahmoud Talaat in the first round at the 1946 Wimbledon championship, but was eliminated in the second round by Bernard Destremau.

Darkins was married to Ursula Fleming, an acclaimed British psychotherapist.

See also
 1946 Wimbledon Championships – Men's singles

References

Year of birth missing
Year of death missing
English male tennis players
British male tennis players
Place of birth missing
20th-century British people